Mohamed Abdul Ramada Hussain (born 5 December 1928) was an Egyptian wrestler. He competed in the men's freestyle middleweight at the 1952 Summer Olympics.

References

External links
  

1928 births
Possibly living people
Egyptian male sport wrestlers
Olympic wrestlers of Egypt
Wrestlers at the 1952 Summer Olympics
Place of birth missing
20th-century Egyptian people